Geno Mateev (3 January 1903 – 6 June 1966) was a Bulgarian footballer. He competed in the men's tournament at the 1924 Summer Olympics.

Honours
Levski Sofia
 Sofia Championship – 1923, 1924, 1925
 Ulpia Serdika Cup – 1926
International
 Football at the 1924 Summer Olympics – 12th place with Bulgaria

References

1903 births
1966 deaths
Bulgarian footballers
Bulgaria international footballers
Olympic footballers of Bulgaria
Footballers at the 1924 Summer Olympics
Footballers from Sofia
Association football midfielders
PFC Levski Sofia players
Bulgarian football managers
Bulgaria national football team managers